José Vargas may refer to:
 José Vargas (baseball) (1905–?), Cuban baseball player
 José Vargas (basketball) (born 1963), Dominican basketball player
 Jose "Joe" Vargas, American YouTuber also known as "Angry Joe"
 Jose Antonio Vargas (born 1981), journalist, filmmaker and immigration rights activist
 José Augusto Vargas, Peruvian politician
 José Gregorio Vargas (born 1982), Venezuelan basketball player
 José Lino Vargas (born 1930), Chilean politician
 José María Vargas (1786–1854), President of Venezuela from 1835 to 1836